Adnen Mansser is a Tunisian author, historian, professor and politician. He is a lecturer in the Faculty of Arts and Humanities of  University of Sousse, and he was the chief of the cabinet of the President of the Tunisian Republic Moncef Marzouki between 30 April 2013 and 17 September 2014 and his official spokesperson.

Qualifications 
 He holds a professorship in history and geography from the École Normale Supérieure de Sousse from June 1989.
 In September 1990 he received a certificate of efficiency in historical research, and in September 1991 received a distinction in history at the Faculty of Humanities and Social Sciences of Tunis University.
 In May 2005 he received a university qualification file, at the Faculty of Arts and Humanities of the University of Sousse

Political life 
After the Tunisian revolution, he was selected as a member of the Higher Authority for Realisation of the Objectives of the Revolution, Political Reform and Democratic Transition between 15 March and June 2011, then became a candidate in the Tunisian Constituent Assembly election, 2011 on 23 October 2011.
He was an adviser and chief of the cabinet of the President of the Tunisian Republic Moncef Marzouki and his official spokesman between 30 April 2013 and 17 September 2014.

Works
 Armed resistance in Tunisia (1881–1939) Part 1, 1997, Higher Institute of the history of the National Movement Publications (with Amira Aleya Sagheer).
 Armed resistance in Tunisia (1939–1956) Part 2, 2004, Higher Institute of the history of the National Movement Publications (with Amira Aleya Sagheer).
 Domination strategy: the French Protectorate and the Tunisian State Institutions, 2003, Faculty of Arts and Humanities of Sousse Publications.
 Bourguiba's State 1956–1970, 2004.
 Durr and metal, 2010.
 Season of Migration to the Dignity, 2011.

References

1966 births
Living people
Academic staff of the University of Sousse
20th-century Tunisian historians
Academic staff of Tunis University
21st-century Tunisian historians